Arbeidets Rett is a local newspaper published in Røros, Norway.

History and profile
Arbeidets Rett was first published as Mauren on 16 January 1907, but has been published under the current name since 4 January 1912. The newspaper is owned by A-Pressen. Its headquarters is in Røros.

Arbeidets Rett is published three times per week. The paper had a circulation of 8,441 copies in 2007.

References

External links
Official site

1907 establishments in Norway
Newspapers published in Norway
Norwegian-language newspapers
Newspapers established in 1907
Mass media in Trøndelag